Susanna Cutini (born in Arezzo, Italy, 1962) is a journalist, a chef and a scholar of Italian recipes. She works for the University of Siena as an expert in the history of cooking, and has programs on RAI and Sky Television.

Biography
Susanna Cutini began her career in the early 1990s focused on communications linked to the history of gastronomy and cooking techniques. In a number of newspapers, radio and television interviews, she tried to blend tradition and innovation in cooking.

In the 2000s, she worked at the University of Siena at the Arezzo Faculty for Humanities and Philosophy with Master Le Rotte del Gusto.

She was the director and co-founder of the magazine taccuinistorici.it, and she directs the laboratories of the Italian cuisine Gastronomy Historical.  She also founded the Social Cooking Italian courses for food and beyond.

In 2011, Cutini won the International Award Silver Venus of Erice (TP) in the category "Gastronomic Literature".

Publications
She is the author of essays on historical and traditional recipes and she has written for the series "Tacuinum" published by Ali&no publishing

 2012 - Tacuinum de' dolci. Mouth-watering recipes in Italian history.
 2011 - De' Hostarie - the food in the history of the wayfarers 
 2010 - Tacuinum Bizantino - gastronomic route in the Eastern Mediterranean 
 2009 - De'Eccellentissimi - tastes and recipes of famous people in history 
 2008 - SPQR at the table with the emperors 
 2007 - De’ Afrodisiaci  - the recipes of seduction 
 2006 - Templars and the diet of the warrior monks 
 2005 - Geniuses of the Renaissance at the table  
 2004 - Etruscan Archaeology gastronomic 
 2003 - Itinerary of Italian food and wine Medieval  
 2002 - Truffle diamond of the kitchen

Collaborations on television and radio
 RAI1 ed. 2011-2012 expert in the history of food traditions in the program Occhio alla Spesa 
 SKY Italia ed. 2011 presenter and author of "Bengodi" program dedicated to food consumption consciousconsapevole 
 RADIORAI 1 ed. 2008/9 curator in the "Notte di Radio 1" of phonebook of Monday of review of books on food & wine 
 Sky/ALICE ed. 2006/7 sent outside of "A tavola con la storia" TV program dedicated to the knowledge of traditions and food 
 Mediaset/RETE4 ed. 2004/5 expert in the history of Mediterranean cuisine to “Fornelli in Crociera”

Notes

1962 births
Living people
Italian food writers
Italian journalists
People from Arezzo
Women food writers
Women cookbook writers
Academic staff of the University of Siena